Jose Renato Casagrande is the Governor of the Brazilian state of Espírito Santo. He was initially governor from 1 January 2011, until 1 January 2015. Then, he was elected to a new term as governor in 2018 and was reelected to a third term in 2022.

Biography
Forester and lawyer, Casagrande was born in Castelo, Espírito Santo and is the son of Augusto Casagrande and Anna Venturim Casagrande. Casagrande is Italian Brazilian. Casagrande is married to Maria Virgínia, with whom he has two children.

In 2020 Casagrande tested positive for COVID-19 along with his wife and mother.

References

1960 births
Living people
People from Castelo, Espírito Santo
Brazilian people of Italian descent
Brazilian foresters
Communist Party of Brazil politicians
Brazilian Democratic Movement politicians
Brazilian Socialist Party politicians
Members of the Chamber of Deputies (Brazil) from Espírito Santo
Members of the Federal Senate (Brazil)
Governors of Espírito Santo
Members of the Legislative Assembly of Espírito Santo